Borneo Tarakan University  is a public university located in Tarakan, North Kalimantan, Indonesia. The university was founded on October 9, 1999, as a private school and had its acknowledgement on March 30, 2000, by a decree issued by Pinekindi Foundation number 011/YP/TRK/III/2000.

History

Founding and early history
Upon realizing that Tarakan is close to the Indonesian border with its two neighboring countries and surrounded by the rich soil and water of Borneo, the Pinekindi Foundation established Borneo Tarakan University on October 9, 1999.

Campuses
Its main campus is located on Jalan Amal Lama, Tarakan.

Organization

University
The rector is Prof. Dr. Drs. Adri Patton, M.Si

Schools and colleges
Borneo Tarakan University is organized into thirteen faculties, each with a different dean and organization.  
 Faculty of Agribusiness
 Faculty of Agro-technology/Agronomy
 Faculty of Aquaculture
 Faculty of Economics and Development Studies
 Faculty of Law
 Faculty of Management
 Faculty of Management of Marine Resources
 Faculty of Indonesian Language and Literature Education
 Faculty of English Language Education
 Faculty of Biology Education
 Faculty of Mathematics Education
 Faculty of Electrical Engineering
 Faculty of Civil Engineering

References

External links 
Official website
 The Tarakan City's website

Tarakan
Universities in Indonesia
Educational institutions established in 1999
1999 establishments in Indonesia
Indonesian state universities